Olympique is the French word for 'Olympic', it may refer to several sports teams:

 Biarritz Olympique, rugby union club from Biarritz, France
 Castres Olympique, rugby union club from Castres, France
 Nîmes Olympique, football club from Nîmes, France
 Olympique Alès, football club from Alès, France
 Olympique Antibes, basketball club from Antibes, France
 Olympique Lyonnais, football club from Lyon, France
 Olympique de Marseille, football club from Marseille, France
 Olympique Nouméa, football club from New Caledonia
 Olympique de Paris, football club from Paris, France (1895–1926)
 Olympique Saint-Quentin, football club from Saint-Quentin, France
 Olympique Saumur, football club from Saumur, France
 Olympique de Valence, football club from Valence, France
 Gatineau Olympiques ice hockey club from Gatineau, Quebec, Canada
 Toulouse Olympique, rugby league club from Toulouse, France